The Dutch Tweede Divisie in the 1968–69 season was contested by 18 teams. De Graafschap won the championship and would be promoted to the Eerste Divisie along with two other teams.

New entrants
Relegated from the Eerste Divisie:
 FC VVV
 Velox

League standings

See also
 1968–69 Eredivisie
 1968–69 Eerste Divisie

References

Netherlands - List of final tables (RSSSF)

Tweede Divisie seasons
3
Neth